Yaser Mohammed Abdulrahman Hamed (born 9 December 1997) is a professional footballer who plays as a centre-back for Al Qadsia. Born in Spain, he represents the Palestine national team.

Club career
The second of five sons born to a Palestinian father and a Basque mother and a product of the esteemed Athletic Bilbao academy which he joined at 10 years of age and departed at 15, Hamed has gone on to play for various Basque sides in the third and fourth tier of Spanish football including CD Santurtzi, SD Leioa, and Club Portugalete. He was in the Portugalete team which won their league group in 2018–19 but narrowly failed to achieve promotion in the play-offs, and was still with them the following season when they managed to follow up a second successive title with promotion; however Hamed left the club at the end of that season.

In January 2022, he transferred to Egyptian Premier League side, Al Masry on a two-and-a-half year contract. He scored his first goal on 20 February, in a 2–0 win against TP Mazembe.

He transferred to Al-Rayyan in August 2022, where he joined players like James Rodríguez. Hamed, however, left the club at the beginning of the year.

International career
Hamed was first contacted by the Palestine national team in July 2019 and made his debut in a 1–0 win over Yemen in the 2019 WAFF Championship. Hamed scored the lone goal in that game, becoming the 17th player in national team history to score on his debut. He went on to play every single minute of the tournament, helping Palestine record their best ever showing at a WAFF Championship finishing behind Iraq with a record of two wins, one draw, and one loss.

Hamed scored his second national team goal two months later in a 2022 FIFA World Cup qualification match against Singapore.

Career statistics

International

Scores and results list Palestine's goal tally first, score column indicates score after each Hamed goal.

References

External links

 
 
 

Living people
1997 births
People from Greater Bilbao
Sportspeople from Biscay
Footballers from the Basque Country (autonomous community)
Association football central defenders
Citizens of the State of Palestine through descent
Palestinian footballers
Palestinian people of Spanish descent
Spanish people of Palestinian descent
Palestinian people of Basque descent
Spanish people of Basque descent
Athletic Bilbao footballers
Arenas Club de Getxo footballers
CD Santurtzi players
SD Leioa players
Club Portugalete players
Busaiteen Club players
Al Masry SC players
Al-Rayyan SC players
Segunda División B players
Tercera División players
Bahraini Premier League players
Palestine international footballers
Palestinian expatriate footballers
Palestinian expatriate sportspeople in Bahrain
Expatriate footballers in Bahrain
Palestinian expatriate sportspeople in Egypt
Expatriate footballers in Egypt
Palestinian expatriate sportspeople in Qatar
Expatriate footballers in Qatar
Palestinian expatriate sportspeople in Kuwait
Expatriate footballers in Kuwait
Qadsia SC players